3 Day Test is a 2012 American comedy film directed and written by Corbin Bernsen and starring George Newbern, Megyn Price, and Bernsen. The film was released on November 6, 2012. The film was retitled in several overseas territories as Home & Alone For Christmas.

Premise
Family father Martin Taylor is out of touch with the members of his family. To better reconnect with them, he comes up with a plan that includes no use of technology, no electricity, and cut off from the outside. Not the winter vacation they were expecting, now the Taylors have to work together to show Dad they can endure his "3 Day Test".

Cast
George Newbern as Martin Taylor
Megyn Price as Jackie Taylor
Corbin Bernsen as Tom
Taylor Spreitler as Lu Taylor
Francesca Capaldi as Jessie Taylor
Aidan Potter as Adam Taylor

Production
3 Day Test was shot in Akron, Ohio.

References

External links
 

2012 films
2012 comedy films
American comedy films
2010s English-language films
Films shot in Ohio
2010s American films